Franeker is one of the eleven historical cities of Friesland and capital of the municipality of Waadhoeke. It is located north of the Van Harinxmakanaal and about 20 km west of Leeuwarden. As of 1 January 2014, it had 12,781 inhabitants. The Eise Eisinga Planetarium, established in 1781, is located in the city.

History

Franeker was founded around 800 as a Carolingian stronghold. The name probably derives from Froon-acker, meaning "land of the lord/king"; the oldest street in the city is still called Froonacker. Beginning around the 11th century, Franeker developed into the administrative center Westergoa.

Franeker received city rights in 1374.  In the 15th century, Albert, Duke of Saxony established himself in Franeker. The city appeared for a time to be growing into the primary city of Friesland, but was eventually overshadowed in this role by Leeuwarden.

During the period of the Dutch Revolt, the town sided early on with William I.

From 1585 to 1811, the city housed the University of Franeker, which was the second Protestant university in the Netherlands. It was closed shortly after the incorporation of the Kingdom of Holland into the French Empire. A successor institution, the Rijksatheneum, was founded in 1815, but in 1847 it, too, closed.

Before 2018, the city was part of the Franekeradeel municipality and before 1984 the city was a municipality of its own.

Geography 
Franeker is located in the municipality of Waadhoeke in the northwest of the province of Friesland in the north of the Netherlands.

Demographics 
As of 1 January 2014, the city of Franeker had a population of 12,781.

Culture

Museums 
The Eise Eisinga Planetarium and the Museum Martena are museums located in the city. The Planetarium is an orrery built by a local wool carder to explain a conjunction of the planets and to help mitigate local fears of what would happen during the planets' alignment. Built in Eisinga's own living room, it is one of the oldest operating orreries in the world. The Museum Martena, opened in 2006, is housed in a manor house built in 1498 and is devoted to the history of the city and the region.

Windmill
The windmill Arkens is a hollow post mill which has been restored. It originally stood in Arkens and was moved in 1972. It is the only windmill in the Netherlands equipped with Vlinderwieken.

Sports 

Franeker is a regular host of the Frisian draughts competitions.

Being one of the Frisian cities, Franeker is also on the route of the  Elfstedentocht (Eleven-cities Tour), an endurance skating event held at irregular intervals depending on weather conditions.

In August 2014, Jeffrey Peereboom, a student from Franeker, introduced an idea of the speed limits for bicycles in order to make biking in the city safer.

Infrastructure

Franeker railway station is a station on the NS line between Leeuwarden and Harlingen. It also had a station on the North Friesland Railway which was the terminus of a branch from Tzummarum. The line opened in October 1903 and closed in October 1933. The station building survives.

Notable people
Sebald Justinus Brugmans
Pia Dijkstra
Eise Eisinga
François Hemsterhuis
Ulrik Huber
Jan Hendrik Oort
Anna Maria van Schurman
Johan Sems
Dennis Wiersma

References

External links

 
Waadhoeke
Cities in Friesland
Cities in the Netherlands
Populated places in Friesland
Former municipalities of Friesland